The Rt Rev Henry Perrott Parker (born 1852, Upton Cheyney – d. Ussagara 1888) was an Anglican bishop in the second half of the 19th century.

Life

Parker was educated privately in Bath and at Trinity College, Cambridge, where he gained his BA in 1871 and his MA in 1875.

Parker went out as a missionary to India, becoming chaplain to the Bishop of Calcutta in 1878.  In 1879, he'd become Secretary of the Church Mission Society North India Mission, an important position with some influence.  However he longed to be more directly involved with evangelism and mission.  In 1885 he requested a transfer to central India to work among the Gondi people. Elevation to the episcopate as the second bishop of Mombasa came soon after (Bishop Hannington had been martyred October 29, 1885) and he sailed for Africa, landing in Frere Town (a colony of ex-slaves near Mombasa that served as CMS headquarters in East Africa) November 27, 1886. He died of malaria while on a trip to Ussagara March 26, 1888.

References

1852 births
Alumni of Trinity College, Cambridge
Anglican missionaries in India
Anglican bishops of Mombasa
19th-century Anglican bishops in Africa
1888 deaths
English Anglican missionaries